Lorenzo Brentano (November 4, 1813 – September 18, 1891) was a German revolutionary and journalist who served as President of the Free State of Baden during the 1849 Baden Revolution. Following the failure of the revolutions, he and many other intellectuals and leaders fled to the United States, where he became editor of the Illinois Staats-Zeitung and eventually served as a member of the United States House of Representatives from Illinois.

Biography

Born as Lorenz Peter Carl Brentano in Mannheim, Grand Duchy of Baden, Germany, Brentano received a thorough classical training and studied jurisprudence at the Universities of Heidelberg and Freiburg. He practiced before the supreme court of Baden.

Brentano was elected to the Chamber of Deputies and in 1848 to the Frankfurt Parliament. He served as president of the provisional republic of Baden established by the revolutionists in 1849. He was sentenced to imprisonment for life after the failure of the revolution, but sought refuge in the United States via Switzerland.

He established Der Leuchtturm, a German anti-slavery journal, in Pottsville, Pennsylvania. He settled in Kalamazoo County, Michigan, and engaged in agricultural pursuits. He moved to Chicago, Illinois, in 1859. He was admitted to the bar in 1859 and commenced practice in Chicago. He became editor-in-chief and principal proprietor of the Illinois Staats-Zeitung from 1862 to 1867. The paper was sold in 1867, and Hermann Raster took over Brentano's position as editor. He served as member of the Illinois House of Representatives in 1862, as a member of the Chicago Board of Education 1862–1868 (serving as its president in 1867 and 1868), and as a delegate to the 1864 Republican National Convention. In 1868 he was presidential elector on the Grant and Colfax ticket.

In 1869, a general amnesty having been granted to the revolutionists of 1849, he revisited his native land. He was appointed United States consul at Dresden in 1872 and served until April 1876. Brentano's son Theodore would become the first American ambassador to Hungary.

Brentano was elected as a Republican to the Forty-fifth Congress (March 4, 1877 – March 3, 1879). He was an unsuccessful candidate for renomination in 1878. 
After leaving Congress, he engaged in literary and historical research designed to compare and contrast the American and European codes of criminal procedure. In this line of work he published a report of the trial of the assassin of President Garfield, and a history of the celebrated case of Kring v. Missouri (see List of United States Supreme Court cases, volume 107).

He died in Chicago, and was interred in Graceland Cemetery.

Notes

References

1813 births
1891 deaths
Politicians from Mannheim
Burials at Graceland Cemetery (Chicago)
German-American Forty-Eighters
German revolutionaries
German people of Italian descent
Members of the Frankfurt Parliament
Republican Party members of the Illinois House of Representatives
People from the Grand Duchy of Baden
People of the Revolutions of 1848
Politicians from Chicago
Heidelberg University alumni
University of Freiburg alumni
Members of the Second Chamber of the Diet of the Grand Duchy of Baden
Republican Party members of the United States House of Representatives from Illinois
Publishers (people) of German-language newspapers in the United States
Illinois Staats-Zeitung people
19th-century American politicians
Presidents of the Chicago Board of Education